Giuseppe Gambino (born 13 August 1968) is a retired Swiss football defender.

References

1968 births
Living people
Swiss men's footballers
FC St. Gallen players
FC Zürich players
FC Schaffhausen players
FC Wil players
Association football defenders
Swiss Super League players